Marixanthomonas is a Gram-negative, aerobic and non-motile genus of bacteria from the family of Flavobacteriaceae with on know species (Marixanthomonas ophiurae).

References

External links
microbewiki

Flavobacteria
Bacteria genera
Taxa described in 2007
Monotypic bacteria genera